Wang Lu (born August 8, 1982 in Taiyuan, Shanxi) is a female Chinese beach volleyball player who competed in the 2004 Summer Olympics.

In 2004, she was eliminated with her teammate You Wenhui in the first round of the women's beach volleyball competition.

References

External links
 
 

1982 births
Living people
Chinese female beach volleyball players
Beach volleyball players at the 2004 Summer Olympics
Olympic beach volleyball players of China
Beach volleyball players at the 2002 Asian Games
Asian Games medalists in beach volleyball
Sportspeople from Taiyuan
Asian Games silver medalists for China
Volleyball players from Shanxi
Medalists at the 2002 Asian Games